GW 170817 was a gravitational wave (GW) signal observed by the LIGO and Virgo detectors on 17 August 2017, originating from the shell elliptical galaxy . The signal was produced by the last minutes of a binary pair of neutron stars' inspiral process, ending with a merger. It is the first GW observation that has been confirmed by non-gravitational means. Unlike the five previous GW detections, which were of merging black holes not expected to produce a detectable electromagnetic signal, the aftermath of this merger was also seen by 70 observatories on 7 continents and in space, across the electromagnetic spectrum, marking a significant breakthrough for multi-messenger astronomy. The discovery and subsequent observations of GW 170817 were given the Breakthrough of the Year award for 2017 by the journal Science.

The gravitational wave signal, designated GW 170817, had a duration of approximately 100 seconds, and shows the characteristics in intensity and frequency expected of the inspiral of two neutron stars. Analysis of the slight variation in arrival time of the GW at the three detector locations (two LIGO and one Virgo) yielded an approximate angular direction to the source. Independently, a short (~2 seconds' duration) gamma-ray burst, designated GRB 170817A, was detected by the Fermi and INTEGRAL spacecraft beginning 1.7 seconds after the GW merger signal. These detectors have very limited directional sensitivity, but indicated a large area of the sky which overlapped the gravitational wave position. It has been a long-standing hypothesis that short gamma-ray bursts are caused by neutron star mergers.

An intense observing campaign then took place to search for the expected emission at optical wavelengths. An astronomical transient designated AT 2017gfo (originally, SSS 17a) was found, 11 hours after the gravitational wave signal, in the galaxy  during a search of the region indicated by the GW detection. It was observed by numerous telescopes, from radio to X-ray wavelengths, over the following days and weeks, and was shown to be a fast-moving, rapidly-cooling cloud of neutron-rich material, as expected of debris ejected from a neutron-star merger.

In October 2018, astronomers reported that , a gamma-ray burst event detected in 2015, may be analogous to GW 170817. The similarities between the two events, in terms of gamma ray, optical, and x-ray emissions, as well as to the nature of the associated host galaxies, are considered "striking", and this remarkable resemblance suggests the two separate and independent events may both be the result of the merger of neutron stars, and both may be a hitherto-unknown class of kilonova transients. Kilonova events, therefore, may be more diverse and common in the universe than previously understood, according to the researchers. In retrospect, GRB 160821B, another gamma-ray burst event is now construed to be another kilonova, by its resemblance of its data to AT2017gfo, part of the multi-messenger now denoted GW170817. In December 2022, astronomers suggested that kilonovae could also be found in long duration GRBs.

Announcement

The observations were officially announced on 16 October 2017 at press conferences at the National Press Club in Washington, D.C. and at the ESO headquarters in Garching bei München in Germany.

Some information was leaked before the official announcement, beginning on 18 August 2017 when astronomer J. Craig Wheeler of the University of Texas at Austin tweeted "New LIGO. Source with optical counterpart. Blow your sox off!". He later deleted the tweet and apologized for scooping the official announcement protocol. The collaboration had earlier declined to comment on the rumors, not adding to a previous announcement that there were several triggers under analysis.

Gravitational wave detection

The gravitational wave signal lasted for approximately 100 seconds starting from a frequency of 24 hertz. It covered approximately 3,000 cycles, increasing in amplitude and frequency to a few hundred hertz in the typical inspiral chirp pattern, ending with the collision received at 12:41:04.4 UTC. It arrived first at the Virgo detector in Italy, then 22 milliseconds later at the LIGO-Livingston detector in Louisiana, United States, and another 3 milliseconds later at the LIGO-Hanford detector in the state of Washington, in the United States. The signal was detected and analyzed by a comparison with a prediction from general relativity defined from the post-Newtonian expansion.

An automatic computer search of the LIGO-Hanford datastream triggered an alert to the LIGO team about 6 minutes after the event. The gamma-ray alert had already been issued at this point (16 seconds post-event), so the timing near-coincidence was automatically flagged. The LIGO/Virgo team issued a preliminary alert (with only the crude gamma-ray position) to astronomers in the follow-up teams at 40 minutes post-event.

Sky localisation of the event requires combining data from the three interferometers; this was delayed by two problems. The Virgo data were delayed by a data transmission problem, and the LIGO Livingston data were contaminated by a brief burst of instrumental noise a few seconds prior to event peak, but persisting parallel to the rising transient signal in the lowest frequencies. These required manual analysis and interpolation before the sky location could be announced about 4.5 hours post-event. The three detections localized the source to an area of 31 square degrees in the southern sky at 90% probability. More detailed calculations later refined the localization to within 28 square degrees. In particular, the absence of a clear detection by the Virgo system implied that the source was in one of Virgo's blind spots; this absence of signal in Virgo data contributed to considerably reduce the source containment area.

Gamma ray detection

The first electromagnetic signal detected was GRB 170817A, a short gamma-ray burst, detected  after the merger time and lasting for about 2 seconds.

GRB 170817A was discovered by the Fermi Gamma-ray Space Telescope, with an automatic alert issued just 14 seconds after the GRB detection. After the LIGO/Virgo circular 40 minutes later, manual processing of data from the INTEGRAL gamma-ray telescope also detected the same GRB. The difference in arrival time between Fermi and INTEGRAL helped to improve the sky localization.

This GRB was relatively faint given the proximity of the host galaxy , possibly due to its jets not being pointed directly toward Earth, but rather at an angle of about 30 degrees to the side.

Electromagnetic follow-up

A series of alerts to other astronomers were issued, beginning with a report of the gamma-ray detection and single-detector LIGO trigger at 13:21 UTC, and a three-detector sky location at 17:54 UTC. These prompted a massive search by many survey and robotic telescopes. In addition to the expected large size of the search area (about 150 times the area of a full moon), this search was challenging because the search area was near the Sun in the sky and thus visible for at most a few hours after dusk for any given telescope.

In total six teams (One-Meter, Two Hemispheres (1M2H), DLT40, VISTA, Master, DECam, and Las Cumbres Observatory (Chile)) imaged the same new source independently in a 90-minute interval. The first to detect optical light associated with the collision was the 1M2H team running the Swope Supernova Survey, which found it in an image of  taken 10 hours and 52 minutes after the GW event by the  Swope Telescope operating in the near infrared at Las Campanas Observatory, Chile. They were also the first to announce it, naming their detection SSS 17a in a circular issued 1226 post-event. The new source was later given an official International Astronomical Union (IAU) designation of AT 2017gfo.

The 1M2H team surveyed all galaxies in the region of space predicted by the gravitational wave observations, and identified a single new transient. By identifying the host galaxy of the merger, it is possible to provide an accurate distance consistent with that based on gravitational waves alone.

The detection of the optical and near-infrared source provided a huge improvement in localisation, reducing the uncertainty from several degrees to 0.0001 degree; this enabled many large ground and space telescopes to follow up the source over the following days and weeks.
Within hours after localization, many additional observations were made across the infrared and visible spectrum. Over the following days, the colour of the optical source changed from blue to red as the source expanded and cooled.

Numerous optical and infrared spectra were observed; early spectra were nearly featureless, but after a few days, broad features emerged indicative of material ejected at roughly 10 percent of light speed. There are multiple strong lines of evidence that AT 2017gfo is indeed the aftermath of GW 170817. The colour evolution and spectra are dramatically different from any known supernova. The distance of NGC 4993 is consistent with that independently estimated from the GW signal. No other transient has been found in the GW sky localisation region. Finally, various archive images pre-event show nothing at the location of AT 2017gfo, ruling out a foreground variable star in the Milky Way.

The source was detected in the ultraviolet (but not in X-rays) 15.3 hours after the event by the Swift Gamma-Ray Burst Mission. After initial lack of X-ray and radio detections, the source was detected in X-rays 9 days later using the Chandra X-ray Observatory, and 16 days later in the radio using the Karl G. Jansky Very Large Array (VLA) in New Mexico. More than 70 observatories covering the electromagnetic spectrum observed the source.

The radio and X-ray light continued to rise for several months after the merger, and have been represented to be diminishing. Astronomers reported obtaining optical images of GW170817 afterglow using the Hubble Space Telescope. In March 2020, continued X-ray emission at 5-sigma was observed by the Chandra Observatory 940 days after the merger, demanding further augmentation or refutation of prior models that had previously been supplemented with additional post-hoc interventions.

Other detectors
No neutrinos consistent with the source were found in follow-up searches by the IceCube and ANTARES neutrino observatories and the Pierre Auger Observatory. A possible explanation for the non-detection of neutrinos is because the event was observed at a large off-axis angle and thus the outflow jet was not directed towards Earth.

Astrophysical origin and products
The gravitational wave signal indicated that it was produced by the collision of two neutron stars with a total mass of  times the mass of the sun (solar masses ).

The masses of the component stars have greater uncertainty.

The origin and properties (masses and spins) of a double neutron star system like GW170817 are the result of a long sequence of complex binary star interactions.

The neutron star merger event is thought to result in a spherically expanding kilonova, characterized by a short gamma-ray burst followed by a longer optical "afterglow" powered by the radioactive decay of heavy r-process nuclei. Kilonovae are candidates for the production of half the chemical elements heavier than iron in the Universe. A total of 16,000 times the mass of the Earth in heavy elements is believed to have formed, including approximately 10 Earth masses just of the two elements gold and platinum.

A hypermassive neutron star was believed to have formed initially, as evidenced by the large amount of ejecta (much of which would have been swallowed by an immediately forming black hole). The lack of evidence for emissions being powered by neutron star spin-down, which would occur for longer-surviving neutron stars, suggest it collapsed into a black hole within milliseconds.

One search claimed to find evidence of a gravitational wave signal from the remnant neutron star or black hole, the energy of which was below the estimated sensitivity of the LIGO search algorithms at the time  and has recently been confirmed by a statistically independent method of analysis revealing the central engine of GRB170817A.

Scientific importance

Scientific interest in the event was enormous, with dozens of preliminary papers (and almost 100 preprints) published the day of the announcement, including 8 letters in Science, 6 in Nature, and 32 in a special issue of The Astrophysical Journal Letters devoted to the subject. The interest and effort was global: The paper describing the multi-messenger observations is coauthored by almost 4,000 astronomers (about one-third of the worldwide astronomical community) from more than 900 institutions, using more than 70 observatories on all 7 continents and in space.

This may not be the first observed event that is due to a neutron star merger; GRB 130603B was the first plausible kilonova suggested based on follow-up observations of short-hard gamma-ray bursts. It is, however, by far the best observation, making this the strongest evidence to date to confirm the hypothesis that some mergers of binary stars are the cause of short gamma-ray bursts.

The event also provides a limit on the difference between the speed of light and that of gravity. Assuming the first photons were emitted between zero and ten seconds after peak gravitational wave emission, the difference between the speeds of gravitational and electromagnetic waves, vGW − vEM, is constrained to between −3×10−15 and +7×10−16 times the speed of light, which improves on the previous estimate by about 14 orders of magnitude. In addition, it allowed investigation of the equivalence principle (through Shapiro delay measurement) and Lorentz invariance. The limits of possible violations of Lorentz invariance (values of 'gravity sector coefficients') are reduced by the new observations, by up to ten orders of magnitude. GW 170817 also excluded some alternatives to general relativity, including variants of scalar–tensor theory, Hořava–Lifshitz gravity, Dark Matter Emulators, and bimetric gravity, Furthermore, an analysis published in July 2018 used GW170817 to show that gravitational waves propagate through 3+1 dimensional spacetime, in line with general relativity and contradicting hypotheses of "leakage" to higher dimensions of space.

Gravitational wave signals such as GW 170817 may be used as a standard siren to provide an independent measurement of the Hubble constant. An initial estimate of the constant derived from the observation is  (km/s)/Mpc, broadly consistent with current best estimates. Further studies improved the measurement to  (km/s)/Mpc. Together with the observation of future events of this kind the uncertainty is expected to reach two percent within five years and one percent within ten years.

Electromagnetic observations helped to support the theory that the mergers of neutron stars contribute to rapid neutron capture r-process nucleosynthesis and are significant sources of r-process elements heavier than iron, including gold and platinum, which was previously attributed exclusively to supernova explosions. The first identification of r-process elements in a neutron star merger was obtained during a re-analysis of GW170817 spectra. The spectra provided direct proof of strontium production during a neutron star merger. This also provided a direct proof that neutron stars are made of neutron-rich matter.

In October 2017, Stephen Hawking, in his last broadcast interview, presented the overall scientific importance of GW170817. In September 2018, astronomers reported related studies about possible mergers of neutron stars (NS) and white dwarfs (WD): including NS-NS, NS-WD, and WD-WD mergers.

See also 

 Gravitational-wave astronomy
 List of gravitational wave observations
 Multi-messenger astronomy

Notes

References

External links 

 
 
 Related videos (16 October 2017):
 
 
 
 
 
 

Neutron stars
Gravitational waves
August 2017 events
2017 in science
2017 in space
Hydra (constellation)